Miconia calophylla is a species of plant in the family Melastomataceae. It is endemic to Peru.

References

calophylla
Vulnerable plants
Endemic flora of Peru
Trees of Peru
Taxonomy articles created by Polbot